The 4th G7 Summit was held at Bonn, West Germany between 16 and 17 July 1978. The venue for the summit meeting was at the former official residence of the Chancellor of the Federal Republic of Germany in Bonn, the Palais Schaumburg.
 
The Group of Seven (G7) was an unofficial forum which brought together the heads of the richest industrialized countries: France, West Germany, Italy, Japan, the United Kingdom, the United States, Canada (since 1976), and the President of the European Commission (starting officially in 1981). The summits were not meant to be linked formally with wider international institutions; and in fact, a mild rebellion against the stiff formality of other international meetings was a part of the genesis of cooperation between France's president Valéry Giscard d'Estaing and West Germany's chancellor Helmut Schmidt as they conceived the first Group of Six (G6) summit in 1975.

Leaders at the summit

The G7 is an unofficial annual forum for the leaders of Canada, the European Commission, France, West Germany, Italy, Japan, the United Kingdom and the United States.

The 4th G7 summit was the last summit for British Prime Minister James Callaghan and Japanese Prime Minister Takeo Fukuda.

Participants
These summit participants are the current "core members" of the international forum:

Issues
The summit was intended as a venue for resolving differences among its members. As a practical matter, the summit was also conceived as an opportunity for its members to give each other mutual encouragement in the face of difficult economic decisions. This was the first summit where rather than simply issuing joint statements, participants committed themselves to policy decisions.

Gallery

See also
 G8

Notes

References
 Bayne, Nicholas and Robert D. Putnam. (2000).  Hanging in There: The G7 and G8 Summit in Maturity and Renewal. Aldershot, Hampshire, England: Ashgate Publishing. ; OCLC 43186692
 Reinalda, Bob and Bertjan Verbeek. (1998).  Autonomous Policy Making by International Organizations. London: Routledge.  ; ;   OCLC 39013643

External links
 No official website is created for any G7 summit prior to 1995 -- see the 21st G7 summit.
 University of Toronto: G8 Research Group, G8 Information Centre
 G7 1978, delegations & documents

G7 summit
1978 in international relations
G7 summit
G7 summit
G7 summit 1978
G7 summit 1978
1978
History of Bonn
July 1978 events in Europe